Sunday Morning in Victoria Park is a 2010 Indonesian film directed by Lola Amaria. It was filmed in Hong Kong and Indonesia. The film was stars Lola Amaria, Titi Sjuman, Donny Alamsyah, and Donny Damara, and was released on 10 June 2010.

The film was nominated for Citra Award for Best Film at the 2010 Indonesian Film Festival, "Best Film Poster" at the 2011 Festival Film Bandung, and "Favorite Film" at the 2011 Indonesian Movie Awards.

Cast
 Lola Amaria as Mayang
 Titi Sjuman as Sekar
 Donny Alamsyah as Vincent
 Donny Damara as Gandi
 Permata Sari Harahap as Yati
 Imelda Soraya as Sari
 Kangen Band as supporting band

Awards and nominations

References

External links
 Situs Resmi
 Ulasan di Cineplex
 

2010 films
Indonesian drama films